The second conference of the 2021 PBA 3x3 season started on February 19, 2022, and ended on April 27, 2022. It consisted of six two-day legs and a grand final. Pioneer Pro Tibay became the conference's Grand Champion after defeating Sista Super Sealers in the Grand Finals, 12–10.

Teams
The players listed have played in at least one of the legs.

1st leg

Groupings
The preliminary drawing of lots was held on February 14, 2022.

Preliminary round

Pool A

Pool B

Pool C

Knockout stage
TNT Tropang Giga defeated Meralco Bolts 3x3 in the finals, 21–19, to become the first leg winners.

Bracket

Knockout game

Quarterfinals

Semifinals

Third place game

Finals

Final standings

2nd leg

Groupings

Preliminary round

Pool A

Pool B

Pool C

Knockout stage
San Miguel Beermen defeated Barangay Ginebra San Miguel in the finals, 21–15, to become the second leg winners.

Bracket

Knockout game

Quarterfinals

Semifinals

Third place game

Finals

Final standings

3rd leg

Groupings

Preliminary round

Pool A

Pool B

Pool C

Knockout stage
Limitless Appmasters defeated TNT Tropang Giga in the finals, 21–20, to become the third leg champions.

Bracket

Knockout game

Quarterfinals

Semifinals

Third place game

Finals

Final standings

4th leg

Groupings

Preliminary round

Pool A

Pool B

Pool C

Knockout stage
Meralco Bolts 3x3 defeated Limitless Appmasters in the finals, 17–14, to become the fourth leg champions.

Bracket

Knockout game

Quarterfinals

Semifinals

Third place game

Finals

Final standings

5th leg

Groupings

Preliminary round

Pool A

Pool B

Pool C

Knockout stage
Limitless Appmasters defeated TNT Tropang Giga in the finals, 22–19, to become the fifth leg champions.

Bracket

Knockout game

Quarterfinals

Semifinals

Third place game

Finals

Final standings

6th leg

Groupings

Preliminary round

Pool A

Pool B

Pool C

Knockout stage
San Miguel Beermen defeated Pioneer Pro Tibay in the finals, 21–17, to become the sixth leg champions.

Bracket

Knockout game

Quarterfinals

Semifinals

Third place game

Finals

Final standings

Legs summary

Grand Finals

Preliminary round

Pool A

Pool B

The game between Barangay Ginebra San Miguel and Platinum Karaoke was initially delayed as smoke filled up the court. Players, coaches, and other personnel were evacuated from the court as firefighters responded to the scene. It was later determined to be caused by a fire breaking out in one area of the arena. The aforementioned game and the scheduled knockout stage games were subsequently postponed. The remaining games were rescheduled on April 27 at the Ynares Sports Arena.

Knockout stage

Bracket
Seed refers to the position of the team after six legs. Letter and number inside parentheses denotes the pool letter and pool position of the team, respectively, after the preliminary round of the Grand Finals.

Quarterfinals

Semifinals

Third place game

Finals

References

3x3 2nd
Pba 3x3
Pba 2nd conference